The 1993–94 Japan Ice Hockey League season was the 28th season of the Japan Ice Hockey League. Six teams participated in the league, and the Shin Oji Seishi won the championship.

Regular season

Playoffs

Semifinals 
 Shin Oji Seishi - Seibu Tetsudo 3:0 (5:1, 4:2, 3:2)

Final
 Kokudo Ice Hockey Club - Shin Oji Seishi 1:3 (2:5, 5:4, 2:3, 2:4)

External links
 Japan Ice Hockey Federation

Japan
Ice Hock
Japan Ice Hockey League seasons
Japan